The Heydarian Stadium is a multi-purpose stadium in Qom, Iran.  It is currently used mostly for football matches and is the home stadium of Qomi football teams who play in Iran football 2nd division and 3rd division. The stadium holds 3,000 people.

External links

Football venues in Iran
Multi-purpose stadiums in Iran
Buildings and structures in Qom
Sport in Qom Province